The Uchucklesaht Tribe, or Uchucklesaht First Nation, is a modern treaty government located on the west coast of Vancouver Island in British Columbia, Canada.  It is a member of the Maa-nulth Treaty Society and the Nuu-chah-nulth Tribal Council.

See also
Nuu-chah-nulth people
Nuu-chah-nulth language

References

External links
Uchucklesaht Tribe website
Nuu-chah-nulth Tribal Council homepage

Nuu-chah-nulth governments
Barkley Sound region